The Kepler Museum is a museum of astronomy in Prague, Czech Republic, named for the German astronomer Johannes Kepler. It was founded in 2009, the International Year of Astronomy, with financial support from the Magistrate of the Capital City of Prague and Agentura ProVas, professional and organisational support from the Czech Astronomic Society and using premises owned by Jitka Steinwaldová.

The three circles in the logo of the Kepler Museum represent the planet Mars, the Earth, and the Sun, the bodies whose mutual positions were studied by Johannes Kepler while he was in the city. The entrance tickets to the museum feature the astronomic dial of the Prague Astronomical Clock with the exact moment of entry to the museum, with the same data also expressed in the Old Bohemian and in the Babylonian manner. The sidereal time is also included. The entrance tickets were designed by Vojtěch Sedláček, CEO of Agentura ProVás.

On 31 December 2017, the Kepler Museum in the Old Town closed after eight years, to be taken over by the National Technical Museum (NTM). The Kepler Museum exhibition is being transferred to NTM premises on Letná. The scheduled opening Summer 2018.

External links
 Web Kepler Museum in Prague
 Web Czech Astronomic Society

Museums in Prague
Astronomy museums
Museums established in 2009
Science museums in the Czech Republic